Newbie Junction Halt railway station was a railway station in Dumfries and Galloway, Scotland, located just west of Annan on the old Glasgow and South Western Railway main line that briefly served workers employed 0.5 mile or circa 800 metres away at the Cochran & Co. Boiler factory and the Newbie Brick and Tile Works at Newbie. The Newbie Siding branched off near the halt and was accessed from the west.

History 
 The halt was not open to the general public and only served workers at the factories served by the Newbie Branch. Trains served this workers halt in the morning and evening. It is not recorded if workers were taken to their destination by rail or whether they walked the short half-mile, however it seems unlikely given the short distance and a passenger carriage would be required and a platform of some description at the end of the line. The Newbie Brick and Tile Works had closed and the track lifted by 1929 and terraced housing was constructed for the boiler factory employees. The halt opened around 1898 and was closed around 1904.

Operation
In 1898 the key for Newbie Junction was kept in an Annan railway station signal box and the Newbie Junction box was opened as required by a porter travelling by train from Annan.

In 1898 no trains were permitted to call at Newbie Branch Junction during foggy weather or between sunset and sunrise unless the Main Line and Branch Signals were lit.

if a train had to call at Newbie Junction the following procedures were to be followed with "Is Line Clear?" signalled "as applicable to a train calling at an intermediate siding in a Block Section must be sent to Cummertrees. The signalman in Annan Cabin must not allow a Down Train to follow until the "Line Clear" or "Train out of Section" Signal, as the case may be has been received from Cummertrees, indicating that the train which called at Newbie Branch Junction has arrived complete with the tail lamp attached, and has passed forward clear of the section, or been shunted clear of the Down Line."

Infrastructure
The halt stood on a double track section of track and the mineral branch was served by trains from the west. No details survive of the stations construction however it is likely to have been built of wood. The halt was 73 miles from Kilmarnock railway station. A signal box stood on the south side of the line here, opposite the junction to Newbie with main line and branch signal posts present. A network of lanes joined the station site with the nearby factories via Milnfield and a path running beside the River Annan.

The site today
The single track Newbie Branch line ran into the boiler factory that has now been mostly lifted and nothing remains of the halt. The large factory site is partly camouflaged by tree plantations and some unused track remains in situ within the works itself. No signal box is present and an old crossover has been lifted.

References

Sources

 Lindsay, David M. E. (2002). G&SWR. Register of Stations, Routes and Lines. Kilmarnock:G&SWR Association.
 Wham, Alasdair (2017). Exploring Dumfries & Galloway's Lost Railway Heritage. Catrine:The Oakwood Press. .

External links

The Newbie Branch Railway

Disused railway stations in Dumfries and Galloway
Former Glasgow and South Western Railway stations
Railway stations in Great Britain opened in 1898
Railway stations in Great Britain closed in 1904